Rev. Paul Beyerl, (pronounced "bye'-rul") born 1945 in Owen, Wisconsin, is known as an author and educator, and particularly as a Wiccan priest, in Wiccan and neopagan circles.

Biography

The property is known as The Hermit’s Grove 
and is a retreat and educational center for The Rowan Tree Church and The Hermit's Grove. It houses the administrative offices, guest lodging for Church Members and students, a 4500-book research library, and the herbal area holding more than 200 species of dried botanicals.
               
The Rowan Tree Church is Wiccan, representing The Tradition of Lothloriën. Beyerl founded both in the 1970s when living in Minneapolis. The Rowan Tree Church trains its clergy in The Mystery School, a challenging and in-depth educational program. Both the Church and Mystery School serve Church Members and students living both near the center and at great distances. The Tradition is discussed at length in Beyerl’a book A Wiccan Bardo, Revisited.

The Hermit's Grove, incorporated in 1994 as a separate nonprofit organization supportive of the     Church, was merged into The Rowan Tree Church in 2011. The Hermit's Grove includes the publishing house for the Church, and the Master Herbalist Program, an extensive study in botanical medicine. Beyerl is known as a Master Herbalist. He has been teaching programs in herbal medicine since the 1970s. In addition to numerous appearances throughout the U.S., Beyerl has taught in Canada and Portugal.

Deceased on December 30, 2021 at home in Houston, Minnesota.

Publications 

Beyerl began publishing a Wiccan newsletter - The Unicorn - in 1977. It is now among the longest-published Wiccan newsletters in North America, in continuous publication since 1977.

Bibliography

• The Master Book of Herbalism (1984) Phoenix Publishing

• A Wiccan Bardo: Initiation and Self-Transformation originally published by Prism Press in England and the U.S. and by Unity Press in Australia in 1989.

• A Wiccan Reader Vol 1 (1994) 

• A Wiccan Reader Vol 2 (2010) 

• Painless Astrology (1997) Hermit's Grove

• The Holy Books of the Devas (1998) The Hermit's Grove

• A Compendium of Herbal Magick (1998) Phoenix Publishing

• A Wiccan Bardo, Revisited (1999) The Hermit’s Grove

• The Symbols and Magick of Tarot (2005) The Hermit's Grove

• Gem and Mineral Lore (2005) The Hermit's Grove

• On Death & Dying (2014) The Hermit's Grove

Discography
 The Arts of Healing - Lecture on cassette (ACE)
 Initiation and Initiatory Orders (Panel Discussion with Ian Corrigan, Liafal, and Donald Michael Kraig) (ACE)

References

 Bond, Lawrence & Ellen Evert Hopman (1996) People of the Earth: The New Pagans Speak Out. (reissued as Being a Pagan: Druids, Wiccans & Witches Today in 2002: Destiny Books ) Interview.
 Lewis, James & Shelley Rabinovitch (2002) The Encyclopedia of Modern Witchcraft and Neo-Paganism. Citadel , 
 O'Gaea, Ashleen (2003) In the Service of Life: A Wiccan Perspective on Death. C Trade Paper , 
 Raeburn, Jane (2001) Celtic Wicca: Ancient Wisdom for the 21st Century. Citadel ,

External links 
 The Hermit's Grove
 The Rowan Tree Church

1945 births
Living people
People from Clark County, Wisconsin
Writers from Minnesota
Wiccan priests
American Wiccans
20th-century American writers
21st-century American writers
20th-century American clergy
21st-century American clergy